William Edward Michael Leeds (4 April 1880 – 6 April 1955) was an Australian rules footballer who played with Carlton in the Victorian Football League (VFL).

Leeds, who could play both forward and down back, had his first season for Carlton in 1903 but then retired to pursue an umpiring career. After officiating in two games early in the 1904 VFL season, Carlton lured him back to the club to fill a gap left by injuries and he starred from the half back flank in their Semi Final win over Essendon. He also played in their losing Grand Final that year which makes him the only league footballer to umpire a match and appear in a Grand Final in the same season.

References

Holmesby, Russell and Main, Jim (2007). The Encyclopedia of AFL Footballers. 7th ed. Melbourne: Bas Publishing.

1880 births
Australian rules footballers from Melbourne
Carlton Football Club players
Brunswick Football Club players
Australian Football League umpires
1955 deaths
People from Carlton, Victoria